P. vanzolinii may refer to:
 Phenacosaurus vanzolinii, a lizard species
 Phrynomedusa vanzolinii, an amphibian species endemic to Brazil

See also
 Vanzolinii (disambiguation)